The 17th Arabian Gulf Cup was held in Doha, Qatar in 2004.  It marked the return of the Iraqi National team back to the competition,
following the fall of Saddam Hussein. Qatar turned out the victors and Oman came in runners up in a close match that ended in a penalty kick shootout.

Matches

Group A

Group B

Semi-finals

Third place playoff

Finals

Winners

References

2004 in Asian football
Arabian Gulf Cup
2004
2004–05 in Yemeni football
2004–05 in Omani football
2004–05 in Bahraini football
2004–05 in Saudi Arabian football
2004–05 in Emirati football
2004–05 in Kuwaiti football
2004–05 in Iraqi football
2004–05 in Qatari football